The Campbell Collaboration is a nonprofit organization that promotes evidence-based decisions and policy through the production of systematic reviews and other types of evidence synthesis. Campbell is composed of coordinating groups that coordinate the production of systematic reviews and evidence gap maps in the following areas: Business & Management, Climate Solutions, Crime & Justice, Disability, Education, International Development, Knowledge Translation & Implementation, Methods, and Social Welfare. It is a sister initiative of Cochrane, with secretariat staff in Oslo and New Delhi. The current president of the board of directors is Jeremy Grimshaw.

Campbell reviews are published in Campbell Systematic Reviews, an open access journal committed to publishing systematic reviews as well as methods research papers, and evidence and gap maps. The Editor-In-Chief is Vivian Welch from the University of Ottawa.

History

The Campbell Collaboration was created as a result of a perceived need for an organization that would produce reviews of the evidence on the effectiveness of social interventions. An exploratory meeting in London in 1999 led to the establishment of the Campbell Collaboration in 2000 and an inaugural meeting at the University of Pennsylvania in Philadelphia, United States, on 24–25 February 2000.

The collaboration was named after the American psychologist Donald T. Campbell (1916-1996), a member of the National Academy of Sciences in the United States.

In December 2004, the American Psychological Association published an article on the work of the Campbell Collaboration.

In May 2005, a special issue of the Annals of the American Academy of Political and Social Science was devoted to describing what the evidence-based approach of the Cochrane Collaboration and Campbell Collaboration had uncovered.

The International Initiative for Impact Evaluation (3ie) and the University of Ottawa established the International Development Coordinating Group (IDCG) in May 2011.

There are two Campbell regional centres: Campbell UK & Ireland, established in 2016 and hosted at The Centre for Evidence and Social Innovation at Queen's University Belfast in the UK, and Campbell South Asia, established in New Delhi, India in 2019. An external affiliated organization called the Campbell China Network in November 2019 as a part of Campbell's strategy to "go East" in 2019-22.

Use by other organizations and policy influence

Campbell reviews are used by organizations and policy-makers to inform decision-making based on research evidence. Charity evaluator and effective altruism advocate GiveWell had listed the Campbell Collaboration as one of its sources of information when trying to assess the state of evidence for various social policies and interventions in the United States and notes their value in determining susceptibility to publication bias of social programs. Campbell reviews have been used to inform policy implementation and guideline development in various countries.

Affiliations

Sponsors 
The Campbell Collaboration has been sponsored by a number of public and private donors, including foundations and government agencies.

Partnerships 
The Campbell Collaboration partners with similar organizations worldwide.

Similar organizations

 Cochrane Collaboration
 Coalition for Evidence-Based Policy
 Laura and John Arnold Foundation
 What Works Clearinghouse
 GiveWell

References

External links
 

Systematic review
Evidence-based practices
International scientific organizations
Social policy
Criminal justice
1999 establishments in England
Non-profit organisations based in Norway
Health economics